Vincenzo Riccati (Castelfranco Veneto, 11 January 1707 – Treviso, 17 January 1775) was a Venetian mathematician and physicist.

Life 
Vincenzo Riccati was the brother of Giordano Riccati, and the second son of Jacopo Riccati. He entered the Society of Jesus on December 20, 1726. He taught belles lettres in the colleges of the Order in Piacenza (1728), Padua (1729), and Parma (1734). He then went to Rome to study theology. In 1739 he was assigned to the Collegio di San Francesco Saverio of Bologna, where he taught mathematics for thirty years. He was among the first members of the Italian National Academy of Sciences.

Riccati's main research continued the work of his father in mathematical analysis, especially in the fields of the differential equations and physics.

In 1757 he published the first volume of Opusculorum ad res physicas et mathematicas pertinentium introducing hyperbolic functions, the second volume appearing in 1762. In collaboration with Hieronymo Saldino he contributed to Institutiones Analyticae, volume one in 1765, volume two in 1767.

Works
 
 
 
 
 
 
 
 Dialogo, dove ne' congressi di più giornate delle forze vive e dell'azioni delle forze morte si tien discorso, Bologna,  1749

See also
 Girolamo Saladini
List of Roman Catholic scientist-clerics

References

 Danilo Capecchi (2012). History of Virtual Work Laws: A History of Mechanics Prospective. Springer. .

External links

1707 births
1775 deaths
People from Castelfranco Veneto
18th-century Italian mathematicians
Catholic clergy scientists
Honorary members of the Saint Petersburg Academy of Sciences
Jesuit scientists